Alfre Woodard (born November 8, 1952) is an American actress. Known for portraying strong-willed and dignified roles on stage and screen, she has received various accolades, including four Emmy Awards, a Golden Globe Award, and three Screen Actors Guild Awards, as well as nominations for an Academy Award and two Grammy Awards. In 2020, The New York Times ranked her as one of "The 25 Greatest Actors of the 21st Century". She is a board member of Academy of Motion Picture Arts and Sciences.

Woodard began her acting career in theater. After her breakthrough role in the Off-Broadway play For Colored Girls Who Have Considered Suicide / When the Rainbow Is Enuf (1977), she made her film debut in Remember My Name (1978). She received an Academy Award for Best Supporting Actress nomination for her role in Cross Creek (1983). 
Woodard starred in films such as Grand Canyon (1991), Passion Fish (1992), Heart and Souls (1993), Crooklyn (1994), How to Make an American Quilt (1995), Primal Fear (1996), Star Trek: First Contact (1996), and Down in the Delta (1998). She earned a BAFTA Award for Best Actress in a Leading Role nomination for her role in Clemency (2019). She also acted in 12 Years a Slave (2013), Annabelle (2014), Captain America: Civil War (2016), Juanita (2019), the remake of The Lion King (2019), and The Gray Man (2022).

Woodard gained prominence for her television role as Dr. Roxanne Turner in the NBC medical drama St. Elsewhere, for which she was nominated for a Primetime Emmy Award for Outstanding Lead Actress in a Drama Series in 1986, and for Guest Actress in 1988. She's received four Primetime Emmy Awards for her roles in the NBC drama series Hill Street Blues in 1984, the NBC series L.A. Law in 1987, the HBO film Miss Evers' Boys (1997), and The Practice in 2003. From 2005 to 2006, Woodard starred as Betty Applewhite in the ABC comedy-drama series Desperate Housewives. In the Marvel Cinematic Universe (MCU) she portrayed the "Black" Mariah Dillard Stokes in the Netflix series Luke Cage (2016–2018).

She is also known for her work as a political activist and producer. Woodard is a founder of Artists for a New South Africa, an organization devoted to advancing democracy and equality in that country.

Early life
Woodard was born in Tulsa, Oklahoma to Constance, a homemaker, and Marion H. Woodard, an entrepreneur and interior designer. She is the youngest of three children. Woodard attended Bishop Kelley High School, a private Catholic school in Tulsa, graduating from there in 1970. She studied drama at Boston University, from which she graduated.

Career

1970s
Woodard made her professional theater debut in 1974 on Washington, D.C.'s Arena Stage. In 1976, she moved to Los Angeles, California. She later said, "When I came to L.A., people told me there were no film roles for black actors. I'm not a fool. I know that. But I was always confident that I knew my craft." Her breakthrough role was in the Off-Broadway play For Colored Girls Who Have Considered Suicide When the Rainbow Is Enuf in 1977. The next year, Woodard made her film debut in Remember My Name, a thriller written and directed by Alan Rudolph. In the same year, she had a leading role in The Trial of the Moke, a Great Performances television film co-starring Samuel L. Jackson.

1980s

In 1980, Woodard had a role in the ensemble comedy film Health directed by Robert Altman. She later appeared in the NBC miniseries The Sophisticated Gents, and had a regular role alongside Catherine Hicks and Tim Matheson in the short-lived comedy-drama Tucker's Witch (1982–83). Later in 1983, Woodard starred opposite Mary Steenburgen in the biography drama film Cross Creek directed by Martin Ritt. For her performance in the film, she was nominated for the Academy Award for Best Supporting Actress. Later in 1983, Woodard won her first Primetime Emmy Award in the Outstanding Supporting Actress in a Drama Series category for her three-episode arc as Doris Robson in the NBC critically acclaimed serial drama Hill Street Blues. Her next television role was on the short-lived NBC sitcom Sara starring Geena Davis. In the next few years, Woodard received critical acclaim for her lead performances in a number of made-for-television films. She was nominated for Primetime Emmy Awards for her roles in the films Words by Heart (1985), Unnatural Causes (1986), and A Mother's Courage: The Mary Thomas Story (1989).

In 1986, Woodard starred opposite Farrah Fawcett in the drama film Extremities, which was based on the 1982 Off-Broadway play by William Mastrosimone. She won a Primetime Emmy Award for Outstanding Guest Actress in a Drama Series for her performance as a woman dying of leukemia in the pilot episode of the NBC drama series L.A. Law. From 1985 to 1986, she also was a regular cast member of the NBC medical drama St. Elsewhere. She played the role of Dr. Roxanne Turner, a strong doctor and the love interest of the Denzel Washington character. She left the show after a single season and guest-starred in 1988. Woodard was nominated for a Primetime Emmy Award for Outstanding Lead Actress in a Drama Series in 1986, and for Outstanding Guest Actress in a Drama Series in 1988, for St. Elsewhere. In 1998, Woodard reprised the role for a sixth-season episode of Homicide: Life on the Street entitled "Mercy". She also was nominated for a Primetime Emmy Award for her guest performance in the show.

In 1987, Woodard played the role of South African activist Winnie Mandela in the HBO film Mandela. She spent several weeks watching news clips and listening to tapes of Winnie to match her accent. She did not win an Emmy, but received a CableACE Award and an NAACP Image Award in the Outstanding Lead Actress category for Mandela. In the next years, she began starring in comedy films like Scrooged (1988) and Miss Firecracker (1989).

1990s
In 1991, Woodard starred in drama film Grand Canyon, directed by Lawrence Kasdan. The film received generally positive reviews from critics and earned $40,991,329 at the box office. The next year, Woodard received major critical acclaim for her performance opposite Mary McDonnell in the drama film Passion Fish, written and directed by John Sayles. The film depicts the struggles of a recently paralyzed daytime soap opera star, and how her outlook is influenced by her nurse, Chantelle, a recovering drug addict played by Woodard. The Rolling Stones Peter Travers described her performance as "superb". She was a promising contender for an Academy Award for Best Supporting Actress category, but did not receive a nomination. However, she did receive her first Golden Globe Award nomination for Best Supporting Actress, and won an Independent Spirit Award for Best Supporting Female. In that same year, she had a comedic role in the fantasy film Heart and Souls opposite Robert Downey, Jr., for which she was nominated for a Saturn Award for Best Supporting Actress.

Woodard starred opposite Danny Glover in the 1993 drama film Bopha! and had the leading role in 1994's semi-autobiographical film Crooklyn, written and directed by Spike Lee. Crooklyn received very positive reviews from critics. During the same period, Woodward also appeared in the films The Gun in Betty Lou's Handbag (1992), Rich in Love (1993), and Blue Chips (1994). In 1995, she co-starred alongside Winona Ryder, Anne Bancroft, Ellen Burstyn, Kate Nelligan, and Maya Angelou in the female ensemble drama film How to Make an American Quilt, for which the entire cast was nominated for the Screen Actors Guild Award for Outstanding Performance by a Cast in a Motion Picture. In 1996, Woodard played Judge Miriam Shoat in the neo-noir crime film Primal Fear with Richard Gere and Edward Norton, as well as portraying Lily Sloane, Zefram Cochrane's assistant in the science fiction film Star Trek: First Contact. Her performance in the franchise film garnered wide critical acclaim. In 1998, she starred as an alcoholic single mother from Chicago forced to spend a summer with her uncle in Mississippi, in the critically acclaimed independent drama Down in the Delta directed by Maya Angelou, her How to Make an American Quilt co-star. For her powerful performance in the film, Woodard was nominated for an Independent Spirit Award for Best Female Lead. In 1999, Woodard had roles in two films: Mumford (alongside her Passion Fish co-star Mary McDonnell), and The Wishing Tree as lead character.

In the 1990s, Woodard also continued her work in television, earning considerable acclaim for her performances. For The Piano Lesson (1995), a Hallmark Hall of Fame film, she won her first Screen Actors Guild Award for Outstanding Performance by a Female Actor in a Miniseries or Television Movie, as well as being nominated for another Primetime Emmy Award for Outstanding Lead Actress in a Miniseries or a Movie. In next year, she received a Primetime Emmy nomination for her performance as the Queen in the critically acclaimed Hallmark miniseries Gulliver's Travels, based on the classic Jonathan Swift novel. In 1997, she had the leading roles in both  The Member of the Wedding (based on the novel by Carson McCullers) and Miss Evers' Boys on HBO. Her performance as the title character in the latter film, as a nurse who consoled many of the subjects of the notorious 1930s Tuskegee study of untreated Blacks with syphilis, earned widespread critical acclaim, sweeping all television awards in the Outstanding Lead Actress in a Miniseries or Movie category, including Primetime Emmy (besting nominees Meryl Streep, Helen Mirren, Glenn Close, and Stockard Channing), Golden Globe, Satellite, NAACP, CableACE, and Screen Actors Guild Awards.

2000s
In the 2000s, Woodard's film career showcased her versatility in a range of genres, including the ensemble comedy-drama What's Cooking? (2000), the romantic drama Love & Basketball (2000) as the lead character's mother, science fiction films K-PAX (2001), The Core (2003), and The Forgotten (2004), the biographical drama Radio (2003), comedies The Singing Detective (2003) and Beauty Shop (2005), the romantic drama Something New (2006), and the dance-musical Take the Lead (2006). Woodard also was nominated for a Golden Globe Award for her performance as a drug addict in the Holiday Heart (2000). In addition, she performed voice work in a variety of feature and television documentaries, as well as a voice role in Walt Disney's Dinosaur. The film was a financial success, grossing over $349 million worldwide.

On television, Woodard guest-starred in two episodes of The Practice in 2003, for which she won her fourth Primetime Emmy Award. In 2005, she joined the cast of the ABC comedy-drama series Desperate Housewives as Betty Applewhite, the new mystery housewife. Her character was introduced in the last episodes of the series' first season, and became the center of the second season's mystery. Series creator Marc Cherry noted: "There's nothing strategically black about her character. Her color is incidental." Woodard stated that she had never seen the show before being offered the role, leading the producers to send her fifteen episodes of the show, which she divided amongst various family members. After they compared storylines, Woodard recalled that she became "instantly hooked" on the series. As soon as Woodard accepted the role of Betty Applewhite, she reported experiencing heavy media attention. Woodard's portrayal of Betty was praised and resulted in a nomination for the Primetime Emmy Award for Outstanding Supporting Actress in a Comedy Series in 2006. However, her mystery as a whole had mixed reviews. In a review of the second-season premiere, Michael Slezak of Entertainment Weekly thought that the Applewhite mystery would help reduce the show's chances of falling into a sophomore slump. He praised Woodard's acting as well as her character's storyline, opining, "there's something so inherently warm and maternal in Woodard's performance, such apple-pie wholesomeness, that it makes her touches of menace all the more chilling." However, as the season progressed, there were many complaints about Betty's lack of interaction with the other housewives. She left the series in the second-season finale episode.
Woodard was nominated for Primetime Emmys for her roles in the television films The Water Is Wide and Pictures of Hollis Woods (2007). She starred as lead in the Tyler Perry's drama film The Family That Preys in 2008. The film received mixed reviews from critics, but her performance received acclaim. Los Angeles Times critic Bob Baker said in his review: "The film takes off when Woodard's and Kathy Bates' characters go on a Thelma & Louise-style road trip.", while The Washington Posts Neely Tucker wrote: "By far the best thing about the enterprise is Woodard. If she's not in this thing, I think it goes kaput.". In next year, she appeared in the independent drama American Violet, playing the mother of a 24-year-old African-American woman wrongfully swept up in a drug raid. She also starred in two short-lived television series: NBC's My Own Worst Enemy (2008), and CBS's Three Rivers (2009).

2010s

From 2010 to 2011, Woodard starred as Lt. Tanya Rice in the TNT comedy-drama series Memphis Beat, winning a Gracie Allen Award for each of its two seasons. One critic said: "I originally tuned in for Jason Lee, who plays a police detective named Dwight who likes to croon the blues. But I was won over by Alfre Woodard, who plays Dwight's by-the-book boss." Memphis Beat was canceled after two seasons. In 2010, she also was cast in the third season of HBO's True Blood as Ruby Jean Reynolds. garnering another Primetime Emmy nomination in 2011 for her recurring role. Woodard also guest-starred in Shonda Rhimes' dramas Grey's Anatomy in 2011 and Private Practice in 2012. Also in 2012, Woodard was cast as Ouiser (played by Shirley MacLaine in the 1989 film) in the remake of the classic comedy-drama film Steel Magnolias. The Lifetime television remake premiered on October 7, 2012, and drew 6.5 million viewers, making it the third most-viewed Lifetime Original film in the network's history. Woodard received critical acclaim for her comedic performance, as well as Primetime Emmy and Screen Actors Guild Awards nominations. In 2013, Woodard made Emmy history with 17 nominations for 16 different roles. Also in 2013, she had a recurring role in the BBC America period drama Copper.

In 2013, Woodard appeared in Steve McQueen's historical drama film 12 Years a Slave as Mistress Harriet Shaw, a formerly enslaved woman who has risen in the Southern caste system. Though her appearance was brief, her performance was praised as powerful. Along with the other cast members, she was nominated for the Screen Actors Guild Award for Outstanding Performance by a Cast in a Motion Picture, in addition to her nomination for a NAACP Image Award for Outstanding Supporting Actress in a Motion Picture for her single-scene appearance. In 2013, she also appeared in Ava DuVernay's short film The Door, a part of Miu Miu's Women's Tales series. The following year, Woodard was cast in the horror-thriller Annabelle and the comedy-drama Mississippi Grind. She also starred in the independent drama film Knucklehead as an abusive mother.

On March 21, 2014, it was announced that Woodard would be playing the role of the first female President of the United States in the NBC political drama pilot State of Affairs opposite Katherine Heigl. The pilot was ordered to series in May 2014. About her role, Woodard said, "It's fun to play the President, rather than to be the President. But what drew me was how smart the script was, and this world we hadn't seen before—this world most Americans didn't know existed before we went after Bin Laden. And that it was being done by people who knew the world. So we're not stepping too outside the boundaries; it's based in realism. And I love politics. I have worked in politics for several decades, so it was a chance to live in a world that was important to me." The series premiered with generally negative reviews from critics, but most reviewers praised Woodard's performance. Amy Amatangelo of Boston Herald  gave the premiere grade "C", stating that, "Alfre Woodard isn't given a lot to do as President Constance Payton in the premiere, but, unlike Heigl, she does have the gravitas for the role, and the show would be wise to use her more. The series sets up some interesting reveals in the hour's final moments. They potentially could make the show more interesting. But for now the state of affairs is rather mediocre." The series was canceled after a single season.
 
In November 2014, Woodard was inducted into the Oklahoma Hall of Fame. She said in her acceptance speech that she believes it is her responsibility to use her fame to help others less fortunate. Also in November 2014, Woodard narrated "Women in Politics", an episode of season 2 of Makers: Women Who Make America.

In 2015, Woodard was cast as a lead in the film adaptation of Sarah Weeks' young adult novel So B. It directed by Stephen Gyllenhaal. The film was released in April 2017 by Good Deed Acquires. In 2016, she also had a small role in Marvel's film Captain America: Civil War, playing Miriam Sharpe, the mother of an American citizen killed in the battle of Sokovia. Later that year, she played "Black" Mariah Dillard Stokes in the Netflix series Marvel's Luke Cage, marking her second portrayal of a character in the Marvel Cinematic Universe. That same year, she was cast in DreamWorks' film Haunted based on Henry James' novel The Turn of the Screw and directing by Juan Carlos Fresnadillo.

In 2017, Woodard was cast as a title character in the independent drama Juanita, based on Sheila Williams' book Dancing on the Edge of the Roof. She also co-starred opposite Michelle Monaghan in Saint Judy. Additionally, Woodard appeared as Josephine Anwhistle in Netflix's adaptation of A Series of Unfortunate Events, which premiered in 2017. In 2018, she took a recurring role in the Fox prime time soap opera Empire, playing Renee, Cookie Lyon's mother.

In 2019, Woodard voiced Sarabi in the CGI live action remake of The Lion King, directed by Jon Favreau. Also that year, Woodard played in a leading role in the prison drama film Clemency, which premiered at the 2019 Sundance Film Festival. The film centers on a prison warden (Woodard) who confronts her own psychological demons as she develops an emotional connection to the death row inmate (played by Aldis Hodge) she is scheduled to execute. For her performance, Woodard has received wide critical acclaim. She was listed as a contender for a nomination in the 2020 Academy Award for Best Actress category, but did not receive a nomination. She received BAFTA Award for Best Actress in a Leading Role nomination for her performance. Also that year, Woodard began starring opposite Jason Momoa in the Apple TV+ original fantasy drama series See, a series set in a future in which the human race has lost the sense of sight.

2020s
In 2021, Woodard starred opposite Kevin Hart in the drama film Fatherhood directed by Paul Weitz. She has also been cast in action thriller The Gray Man for Netflix, with a production budget of $200 million, making it the most expensive film made by Netflix. On September 2, 2021, she was cast in the film adaptation of Salem's Lot playing the role of Dr. Cody, and set to star alongside Morgan Freeman in Hate To See You Go. She also set to appear opposite Blair Underwood in the thriller Viral.

Woodard executive produces and co-starred in the CBC Television period drama series The Porter. The series premiered on February 21, 2022.

Woodard has announced that she is producing an upcoming four-hour television miniseries about Fannie Lou Hamer, a voting rights activist and civil rights leader. The project was first announced in 2014, and in November 2020, ABC Signature ordered it to series.

Personal life
Woodard lives in Santa Monica, California, with her husband, writer Roderick Spencer, and their two children Mavis and Duncan. Woodard follows Christian Science. Her daughter, Mavis, served as Miss Golden Globe for the 2010 Golden Globe Awards.

Woodard is an activist for a wide spectrum of causes. She is a founder and board member of Artists for a New South Africa, a nonprofit organization dedicated to combating the African AIDS pandemic and to advancing democracy and equality in South Africa since 1989. The charity has raised more than $9 million and has provided healthcare to over 3,500 South African AIDS orphans.  Woodard is also a board member of the  Democratic Party, and campaigned for Barack Obama in both the 2008 and 2012 presidential elections. She lends continuing support to the fight for LGBT rights and same sex marriage. In February 2009, she joined a group of American film directors and actors on a cultural trip to Iran at the invitation of the "House of Cinema" forum in Tehran.

On August 9, 2015, Woodard appeared on TLC's Who Do You Think You Are?. Research into her father's genealogy revealed that her great-grandfather Alex Woodard was born into slavery in Houston County, Georgia, in the early 1840s. At about age 14 or 15, Alex was separated from his family when his master relocated to Jackson Parish, Louisiana. Historians helped Woodard locate evidence that Alex was assessed a poll tax in 1867, indicating that he was registered to vote two years after the Civil War ended. By 1881, Alex had purchased 80 acres of farmland in Jackson Parish. On April 15, 1898, Alex Woodard and his wife Elizabeth sold their 80 acres to her brother, Aaron Stell, as they had moved to Wharton County, Texas, by that time. In tribute to Alex Woodard's climb from enslavement to landowner, Alfre poured a libation of water on the land that her great-grandfather and his family acquired by dint of hard work and unwavering determination. The scene closed the program.

Awards and nominations

Woodward has received numerous accolades including four Primetime Emmy Awards, (tying the record for the most acting Emmys won by an African-American performer, along with Regina King), a Golden Globe Award, and three Screen Actors Guild Awards. She also has been nominated for an Academy Award, a BAFTA Award, and two Grammy Award.

Filmography

Film

Television

Theatre

References

Bibliography

External links

 
 
 
 
 
 
 Alfre Woodard  Video produced by Makers: Women Who Make America
 

1952 births
Living people
20th-century American actresses
21st-century American actresses
Actresses from Tulsa, Oklahoma
African-American actresses
African-American Christians
American Christian Scientists
American film actresses
American stage actresses
American television actresses
American voice actresses
Audiobook narrators
Best Miniseries or Television Movie Actress Golden Globe winners
Boston University College of Fine Arts alumni
Converts to Christian Science
Independent Spirit Award for Best Supporting Female winners
Oklahoma Democrats
Outstanding Performance by a Female Actor in a Miniseries or Television Movie Screen Actors Guild Award winners
Outstanding Performance by a Lead Actress in a Miniseries or Movie Primetime Emmy Award winners
Outstanding Performance by a Supporting Actress in a Drama Series Primetime Emmy Award winners